Robin Schaefer (born 1969) is a Norwegian police officer, crime investigator and whistleblower. He published the book Monika-saken. Min historie - fra drapsetterforsker til varsler in 2015. He received the Fritt Ord Award in 2015, shared with Jan Erik Skog.

References

1969 births
Living people
Norwegian police officers
Norwegian non-fiction writers
Norwegian crime writers